Kiran Khan (born December 21, 1989) is a Pakistani Olympic swimmer.  She first came to national attention at the 28th Pakistan National Games in 2001, where she won 7 gold medals, 3 silver medals and 3 bronze medals.

See also 
Rubab Raza — fellow female Pakistani swimmer, who became Pakistan's first female Olympic swimmer at the 2004 Olympics.

References

External links 
 Kiran Khan's Official Website
 Kiran Khan at wix.com.
 Medal at 9th SAF Games, Islamabd PSB

1990 births
Living people
Lahore Grammar School alumni
Olympic swimmers of Pakistan
Pakistani female swimmers
Swimmers from Lahore
Swimmers at the 2002 Asian Games
Swimmers at the 2006 Asian Games
Swimmers at the 2006 Commonwealth Games
Swimmers at the 2008 Summer Olympics
Female backstroke swimmers
Pakistani female freestyle swimmers
Sportswomen from Punjab, Pakistan
South Asian Games silver medalists for Pakistan
South Asian Games bronze medalists for Pakistan
Asian Games competitors for Pakistan
South Asian Games medalists in swimming
Commonwealth Games competitors for Pakistan